The Tragedy of the Dishonoured is a 1924 German silent film directed by Josef Berger and starring Cläre Lotto, Albert Steinrück, and Clementine Plessner.

The film's art direction was by Karl Machus.

Cast

References

External links

1924 films
Films of the Weimar Republic
Films directed by Josef Berger
German silent feature films
German black-and-white films